The Canadian men's national under-20 ice hockey team is the ice hockey team representing Canada internationally in under-20 competition. Their primary participation in this age group comes at the International Ice Hockey Federation's World Junior Championship, held annually every December and January. The team also participates in various exhibition matches and occasional exhibition series, such as the 2007 Super Series against their Russian counterparts, an eight-game exhibition series commemorating the 35th anniversary of the 1972 Summit Series.

The Canadian junior team is the most successful in the world, having medalled in 34 of 46 events held since 1977, winning a record 20 gold medals. Its success can be traced back to the formation of the Program of Excellence in 1982 by the Canadian Amateur Hockey Association, which created the first true national junior team. Since that time, Canada has won 20 of 42 World Junior championships – including five in a row on two occasions, 1993–1997 and 2005–2009.

History

Early tournaments (1974–1981)
The International Ice Hockey Federation (IIHF) created an invitation-only junior tournament for the top ice hockey nations in the world to be held in late December 1973 and early January 1974 in Leningrad, Soviet Union. It featured six teams: the Soviet Union, Czechoslovakia, Sweden, Finland, the United States and Canada. The Canadian Amateur Hockey Association (CAHA) hoped to send the defending Memorial Cup champion Toronto Marlboros to represent Canada, but after they declined, the Peterborough Petes, runner up to Toronto in the Ontario Hockey Association (OHA) standings, was sent. The Petes finished third, despite being the only club team in the tournament

A second tournament was held in 1975, primarily in Winnipeg, Manitoba. The CAHA sent an all-star team made up of players representing the Western Canada Hockey League WCHL as Canada's representative. The team finished in second place with a 4–1 record, their lone loss at the hands of the champion Soviet Union. As the OHA and WCHL had each sent a representative already, the Quebec Major Junior Hockey League (QMJHL) sent Canada's entry in the form of the Sherbrooke Beavers for the 1976 tournament. The team finished second despite scoring only 12 goals and giving up 27 in four games

The growing popularity of international competition begun by the 1972 Summit Series and continued with the Canada Cup led the IIHF to formalize the tournament in 1977 as the IIHF World U20 Championship (colloquially the World Junior Hockey Championship). The defending Memorial Cup champion St. Catharines Fincups of the OHA represented Canada at this first official tournament, winning the silver medal, while Dale McCourt was named the tournament's best forward. The 1978 tournament was held in Montreal. It was the first major international tournament for Wayne Gretzky, a 16-year-old phenom whom the Montreal crowd cheered wildly. Though he led the tournament in scoring with 17 points, Canada managed only a bronze medal after losing the final round-robin game to Sweden, 6–5, in which they needed only a tie for silver.

The following three years yielded poor results.  The 1979 team was represented primarily by the WHL's New Westminster Bruins and finished in fifth place. The CAHA nearly chose not to send a team in 1980 due to travel costs, but donations from the three major junior leagues ensured Canada's participation.  The Peterborough Petes formed the primary core of the team, supplemented by players from other OHA squads.  The result, however, was another fifth-place finish. The 1981 tournament was even worse, as the Cornwall Royals, with some additions from other QMJHL teams, finished in seventh place out of eight teams.

Program of Excellence
The CAHA had long hoped to send a true national team to the tournament, but were limited by costs.  To assemble such a team in 1981 would have cost four times the amount it spent to send the Cornwall Royals. The CAHA lacked the resources for such a program and preferred not to send a team at all if it couldn't send its best. However, it was in a dispute at the time with Hockey Canada and feared that if it did not send a team, the IIHF would turn to the rival governing body instead.  Though the CAHA typically sent the defending Memorial Cup champion, those teams were typically weakened by the loss of graduating players and were often only a shadow of the team which won their championships. Disappointed by frequent complaints from European teams that the Canadian juniors were just "slugs" who couldn't play the game at an elite level, CAHA president Murray Costello finally set out to build a true national team program.

Known as the "Program of Excellence", Costello and the CAHA proposed a multifaceted approach that would see Canada send its top eligible juniors from across the nation.  It included the creation of U-17 and U-18 programs to develop younger players and a summer training camp to evaluate potential players for the junior team.  The three major-junior leagues were initially reluctant to support the proposal, as it would have required them to surrender their top players for a longer period for the tournament, as well as their younger players for regional development tournaments.  The CAHA ultimately gained the support of each league, but not before having to also convince them to allow the organization to also invite eligible players from outside major junior hockey.

The team that was sent to the 1982 Tournament in Rochester, Minnesota was the first true national junior team sent.  It was composed of ten players from the WHL, four from the OHL, three from the QMJHL, two playing United States college and one playing professionally in the Finnish league. The team lacked star players, but relied on a balanced offence and strong defence to post a 6–0–1 record in the round robin tournament. Canada defeated the Soviet Union 7–0 in the second-to-last game, the worst defeat the Soviets suffered in the tournament's history.  The game was played at the Winnipeg Arena before a rabid crowd, which amazed the players.  The Canadians entered the final game, against Czechoslovakia, guaranteed a silver medal, and needed only a tie to win gold.  Played at a half-full arena in Rochester, the Czechs entered the third period leading 2–1, and would have had a larger lead if not for goaltender Mike Moffat.  Two third-period goals gave Canada the lead before the Czechs tied it.  They held on despite a frenzied attack in the final minutes to end with a 3–3 tie, and win Canada's first gold medal in the tournament's history.

The arena either did not have a copy of the Canadian anthem, or had technical difficulty with it, so was unable to follow the IIHF tradition of playing the winning team's anthem following the game.  The players themselves chose to sing the anthem, badly off-key, an image that has since become an iconic moment in the junior program's history.  The gold medal marked the first international amateur championship for Canada in 20 years, and established the value of the Program of Excellence.

Rivalry with the Soviet Union (1983–1991)
Attempting to repeat as champions in 1983, Canada endured numerous incidents and mind games perpetrated by the host Soviet Union.  The Soviets initially refused to grant a sufficient number of visas for the Canadian delegation, then when the team landed in Leningrad, had their clothing and equipment seized immediately by government officials. It was returned three hours later, but only after the team threatened to withdraw from the tournament. Canada's first three games, all wins, were played in a small, empty arena. The fourth game was against the hosts in a larger rink at full capacity, which the team was denied the ability to practice in beforehand.  The players struggled to adapt to the new playing conditions, losing 7–3, and even surrendered a goal when they mistook a whistle from somewhere in the crowd for the referees whistle and stopped playing. The Canadians finished with the bronze medal. The game against the Soviets was a much closer affair in the following year, ending in a 3–3 tie. However, Canada needed a win in the game to retain a chance for gold. Left with bronze as the best possibility, the disheartened Canadians lost to Czechoslovakia in the final game of the tournament and finished in fourth place.

Canada and Czechoslovakia entered their contest on the final day of the 1985 tournament in Sweden with identical 5–0–1 records. Playing for the gold medal, the game was dominated by the goaltenders: Craig Billington and Dominik Hašek. It ended in a 2–2 draw and Canada claimed gold in the round-robin tournament as a result of a better goal differential. It was the nation's first World Championship won on European ice in 24 years. With 5–0 records, Canada and the Soviet Union again faced off for the gold medal in their match-up at the 1986 in Hamilton. The Soviets emerged 4–1 victors and won the gold, while Canada finished as silver medalists.

Believing that the Canada-Soviet match-up would again determine who won gold, the Czechoslovak hosts scheduled the two teams to be the final game of the 1987 tournament. It did not turn out that way, as the Soviets struggled and were eliminated from contention. However, Canada could win silver with a victory, or gold with a victory of 5 or more goals. Norwegian referee Hans Rønning, assigned based on his neutrality despite his inexperience officiating at the international level, quickly lost control as both teams frequently hacked and slashed each other. Midway through the second period, with Canada leading 4–2, a line brawl broke out that ultimately involved nearly every player for both teams after the Soviets left their bench, closely followed by the Canadians. The melee lasted 20 minutes, ending only when the players were too exhausted to continue fighting.  The brawl, which became known as the Punch-up in Piestany, resulted in the disqualification of Canada and the Soviet Union.

Players who were on the 1987 team entered the 1988 tournament in Moscow seeking redemption.  They won the gold medal, finishing the tournament at 6–0–1. The 3–2 victory over the Soviet Union was the difference maker, dropping the tournament hosts to the silver medal. Canada would achieve the same feat at the 1990 and 1991 tournaments, capturing back-to-back gold medals for the first time, hinging on crucial wins over the Soviet Union. This ultimately broke the tie in points at the top of the standings each time, leaving the Soviets with silver.

Golden years (1993–1997)
From 1993 through to 1997, Canada won a record five-straight gold medals. The streak started under difficult circumstances beginning at the 1993 World Junior Ice Hockey Championships in Sweden, one of the most competitive engagements in tournament history. The host Swedes, led by Peter Forsberg, Markus Näslund, and Niklas Sundström, broke scoring records. In 1995, the host Canadians benefited from a squad bolstered by the 1994–95 NHL lockout, resulting in a perfect record en route to winning gold. The streak culminated at the 1997 tournament in Switzerland, with excellent defence and goaltending covering for an offence that struggled early in the competition.

Medal streak (1999–2012)
At the 1999 World Junior Ice Hockey Championships, Canada won silver as hosts in Winnipeg, dropping a 3–2 final in overtime to a powerful, deep Russian team. The tournament set records for attendance. This would also be the start of another unrivaled display of junior hockey by Canada, claiming 14-straight medals from 1999–2012, including their second run of five-straight gold medals from 2005 through to 2009. At the 2009 tournament in Ottawa, where Team Canada last captured gold, Canada faced defeat against Russia in the final seconds of their semi-final before Jordan Eberle scored the equalizing goal with 5.4 seconds remaining in the game, forcing overtime. Canada would win in a shootout and go on to rout Sweden 5–1 in the final. John Tavares, the future first overall selection at the 2009 NHL Entry Draft, was named most valuable player of the tournament.

Sexual assault allegations (2022)

The team's players and Hockey Canada were the subject of allegations of sexual assault after the team visited London, Ontario in 2018, celebrating their gold medal at the 2018 World Championship.

Current roster
Roster for the 2023 World Junior Ice Hockey Championships. (2022–23 teams listed at time of event)

Head Coach: Dennis Williams

World Junior Championship record

The 1974, 1975 and 1976 tournaments were unofficial. The 1974 team was represented by the Peterborough Petes. Canada was ejected from the tournament in 1987 for a bench clearing brawl with the Soviet Union. In 1996, a playoff was added to the tournament (prior to this, it was just a round robin tournament.) Playoff games are included in record. Since 2007, the IIHF has awarded 3 points for a win, 2 points for an overtime win and 1 point for an overtime loss.

† Includes one win in extra time (in the preliminary round)
‡ Includes one loss in extra time (in the preliminary round)
* Includes one win in extra time (in the playoff round)
+ Includes one loss in extra time (in the playoff round)

Super Series
In 2007, the Canadian junior team played the Russian junior team in an eight-game Super Series commemorating the 35th anniversary of the 1972 Summit Series. For the 40th anniversary, the two teams competed in a four-game series in August 2012. The two teams split the series, which was decided on an overtime goal by Ryan Strome after Game 4.

Awards and honours
Canadian players have earned numerous honours throughout the history of the World Junior Championship.

Directorate Awards

All-Star Teams

See also

 Canada men's national ice hockey team

References
Footnotes

General

External links
Hockey Canada
Canada men's U20 ice hockey team all-time scorer list at quanthockey.com

 
Junior national ice hockey teams
Junior ice hockey teams in Canada
National sports teams of Canada